MacGregor is a southern suburb in the City of Brisbane, Queensland, Australia.

MacGregor, like its surrounding suburbs, incorporates a very diverse multicultural community.  It was previously part of Sunnybank, until the suburb was named in 1967.

Geography 
The suburb is in three main parts, divided by the six-lane Kessels Road, and separately, Mimosa Creek.  Most residential buildings are single and two-storey beige brick houses with a tiled roof.

There appears to be no specific naming convention for the roads.  Streets on the eastern part of the suburb include a mixture of plant (Freesia, Gaillardia) and Scottish (Blairgowrie, Carnoustie) names.  On the south-west portion, Angelina and Damson are plum cultivars, Elberta a type of peach, and Jonathan may refer to a type of apple, being some of the agricultural produce that may have been grown in the area before urbanisation.

History
Previously part of Sunnybank, the suburb was named by the Queensland Place Names Board on 1 August 1967. The suburb of MacGregor was named after Scottish-born Sir William MacGregor who was the Governor of Queensland from 1909 until 1914. It is spelt MacGregor, but Macgregor is often seen.

MacGregor State High School opened on 28 January 1969 with nine teachers and 203 students. On 4 November 1973, a tornado struck the school, causing hundred of thousands of dollars' worth of damage and requiring the rebuilding of much of the school.

MacGregor State School opened on 24 January 1972. Students wears the red MacGregor tartan as part of their school uniform.

In the 2011 census, the population of MacGregor was 5,576, 51.6% female and 48.4% male. The median age of the MacGregor population was 32 years of age, 5 years below the Australian median. Of all people living in MacGregor, 41.9% were born in Australia, compared to the national average of 69.8%; the next most common countries of birth were China 15%, Taiwan 6.3%, India 4.6%, New Zealand 3.3% and Vietnam at 2.3%. 44.4% of people spoke only English at home; the next most popular languages were 20.2% Mandarin, 7.2% Cantonese, 2.7% Vietnamese, 2.3% Korean and 2.2% Greek. The most common religious affiliation was 'No religion' (25.7%); the next most common responses were Catholic 16.2%, Buddhism 10.0%, Anglican 8.4% and Uniting Church 5.7%.

Education

MacGregor State School is a government primary (Prep-6) school for boys and girls at McCullough Street. In 2018, the school had an enrolment of 1,347 students with 94 teachers (83 full-time equivalent) and 59 non-teaching staff (37 full-time equivalent).

MacGregor State High School is a government secondary (7-12) school for boys and girls at Blackwattle Street. In 2018, the school had an enrolment of 1,221 students with 115 teachers (107 full-time equivalent) and 55 non-teaching staff (37 full-time equivalent).

Griffith University and the Queensland Sport and Athletics Centre are in the adjoining suburb of Nathan.

Facilities

Additional to the schools, there is a Robertson Scout Group, a large recreational area of the D. M. Henderson Park, and the MacGregor Netball Association playing fields.  The park was named after local resident Daniel Murray Henderson (c. 1871 – 3 July 1954), who was a strawberry and small crops farmer. Henderson lived on Mains Road, near the intersection with Fleetwood Street, MacGregor.

Local residents use either the Westfield Garden City Shopping Centre at Upper Mount Gravatt or the Sunnybank shopping centres (Sunnybank, Sunny Park, Market Square).  Sunny Park Shopping Centre is on the MacGregor suburb corner boundary.

Public transport in the area to Brisbane City is by bus at the MacGregor park-and-ride, or the nearby Garden City Interchange or Eight Mile Plains busway station.  The nearest Queensland Rail suburban railway stations are Altandi, Sunnybank, Banoon or Coopers Plains.

Either side of Kessels Road are large business retail outlet premises as well as a driver licence testing centre.

Mimosa Creek, a tributary to the Bulimba Creek is part of a nature reserve network including the nearby Toohey Forest Conservation Park.

Gallery

References

External links

 
 MacGregor State School 
 MacGregor State High School
 Brisbane City Council Suburb Map
 ourbrisbane.com – MacGregor

Suburbs of the City of Brisbane